Elizabeth A. Zachariadou (1931 – 26 December 2018) was a Greek scholar on Turkish studies, specializing in the early Ottoman Empire (ca. 1300–1600).

Biography 
In 1966 she married the Byzantinist Nikolaos Oikonomides (1934–2000), with whom she went to Canada following the 1967 coup and the establishment of the Regime of the Colonels in Greece.

After studying at the School of Oriental and African Studies at the University of London, she became professor of Turkish studies at the University of Crete from 1985 to 1998, and along with Vasilis Dimitriadis one of the co-founders of the Turkish Studies program of the Institute of Mediterranean Studies in Rethymno. In 1990 she received an honorary doctorate from the University of Ankara, and became a member of Academia Europaea in 1993.

Works 
 Το Χρονικό των Τούρκων Σουλτάνων (του βαρβερινού ελληνικού κώδικα 111) και το ιταλικό του πρότυπο ("The Chronicle of the Turkish Sultans (cod. gr. Barberini 111) and its Italian original"), Thessaloniki 1960
 Trade and Crusade, Venetian Crete and the Emirates of Menteshe and Aydin (1300-1415), Venice 1983
 Romania and the Turks (c.1300 - c.1500), Variorum Reprints, London 1985, 
 Ιστορία και θρύλοι των παλαιών σουλτάνων, 1300-1400 ("History and legends of the old sultans, 1300-1400"), Cultural Foundation of the National Bank of Greece, 1991 . (Second Edition 1999)
 Δέκα τουρκικά έγγραφα για την Μεγάλη Εκκλησία (1483-1567) - Ten Turkish documents concerning the Great Church (1483-1567), Hellenic National Research Institute: Institute for Byzantine Research, 1996, 
 Studies in pre-Ottoman Turkey and the Ottomans, Ashgate Variorum, 2007
 with Anthony Luttrell, Πηγές για την τουρκική ιστορία στα αρχεία των Ιπποτών της Ρόδου, 1389-1422 - Sources for Turkish History in the Hospitallers' Rhodian Archive, 1389-1422, Hellenic National Research Institute: Institute for Byzantine Research, 2009 
 with Gülsün Ayvali, Antonis Xanthynakis, Το χρονικό των Ουγγροτουρκικών πολέμων (1443-1444) ("Chronicle of the Hungarian-Ottoman wars (1443-1444)"), Crete University Press, Rethymno 2005, 

As an editor, she was responsible for the publication of the first four international symposia held by the Turkish Studies program of the Institute of Mediterranean Studies: 
 
 The Ottoman Emirate, ca. 1300–1389. Halcyon Days in Crete I: A Symposium Held in Rethymnon, 11–13 January 1991, Crete University Press, Rethymno 1994, 
 The Via Egnatia under Ottoman Rule, 1380–1699. Halcyon Days in Crete II: A Symposium Held in Rethymnon, 9–11 January 1994, Crete University Press, Rethymno 1997 
 Natural Disasters in the Ottoman Empire. Halcyon Days in Crete III: A Symposium Held in Rethymnon, 10–12 January 1997, Crete University Press, Rethymno 1999, 
 The Kapudan Pasha: His Office and Ηis Domain. Halcyon Days in Crete IV: A Symposium held in Rethymnon, 7–9 January 2000, Crete University Press, Rethymno 2002,

External links 

 Video with an interview of Elizabeth Zachariadou, from the YouTube channel of the research programme "Greek Historiography in the 20th century. The Formation of the Modern Greek Studies" of the University of the Peloponnese, Greece (published on 24 November 2015, in Greek).

References 

1931 births
2018 deaths
20th-century Greek historians
Members of Academia Europaea
Scholars of Ottoman history
Women historians
21st-century Greek historians
20th-century Greek women writers
21st-century Greek women writers
Alumni of SOAS University of London
Academic staff of the University of Crete
People from Thessaloniki